Newhaven Town railway station is the main station serving Newhaven, East Sussex, England, the other being . A third station, formally closed in October 2020, but had not had a train service since 2006.

The station has two platforms, both with Permit to Travel Machines and trains are operated by Southern.

The station is adjacent to the passenger terminal for the Port of Newhaven which has regular ferry sailings to Dieppe in France.  Foot passengers should alight here and not at Newhaven Harbour railway station, which is for the harbour industrial estate and freight terminal.

Services
 the typical off-peak service in trains per hour is:
 2 tph to 
 2 tph to Seaford

There are no longer any direct trains to or from London

Motive power depot
The London Brighton and South Coast Railway opened an engine shed at the station in 1877. British Railways closed it in 1963 and the building is now a private workshop.

Gallery

References

External links

Railway stations in East Sussex
DfT Category E stations
Former London, Brighton and South Coast Railway stations
Railway stations in Great Britain opened in 1847
Railway stations served by Govia Thameslink Railway
Newhaven, East Sussex
1847 establishments in England